Monarcha is a genus of bird in the family Monarchidae. They are found in Australia and Melanesia.

Taxonomy and systematics
The genus Monarcha was introduced by naturalists Nicholas Vigors and Thomas Horsfield in 1827 with the black-faced monarch (Monarcha melanopsis) as the type species. The genus formerly included many more species. Based on the results of a molecular phylogenetic study published in 2005   nineteen species were moved to the resurrected genus Symposiachrus and three to Carterornis.

Extant species
The genus Monarcha contains the following nine species:
 Island monarch (Monarcha cinerascens)
 Black-faced monarch (Monarcha melanopsis)
 Black-winged monarch (Monarcha frater)
 Bougainville monarch (Monarcha erythrostictus)
 Chestnut-bellied monarch (Monarcha castaneiventris)
 White-capped monarch (Monarcha richardsii)
 Yap monarch (Monarcha godeffroyi)
 Tinian monarch (Monarcha takatsukasae)

Former species
Formerly, some authorities also considered the following species (or subspecies) as species within the genus Monarcha:
Black-naped monarch (as Monarcha azurea)
Rarotonga monarch (as Monarches dimidiatus)
Marquesan monarch (as Monarcha mendozae)
Black monarch (as Monarcha axillaris)
Black-bibbed monarch (as Monarcha mundus)
Flores monarch (as Monarcha sacerdotum)
Boano monarch (as Monarcha boanensis)
Spectacled monarch (as Monarcha trivirgatus)
Spectacled monarch (Seram) (as Monarcha nigrimentum)
Spectacled monarch (bernsteinii) (as Monarcha bernsteini)
Spectacled monarch (melanopterus) (as Monarcha melanoptera)
Spectacled monarch (albiventris) (as Monarcha albiventris)
Spectacled monarch (gouldii) (as Monarcha gouldii)
Kai monarch (as Monarcha leucurus)
Tanahjampea monarch (as Monarcha everetti)
Kofiau monarch (as Monarcha julianae)
Biak monarch (as Monarcha brehmii)
Manus monarch (as Monarcha infelix)
Mussau monarch (as Monarcha menckei)
Black-tailed monarch (as Monarcha verticalis)
Djaul monarch (as Monarcha ateralba)
Solomons monarch (as Monarcha barbata)
Malaita monarch (as Monarcha malaitae)
Kolombangara monarch (as Monarcha browni or Monarcha kulambangrae)
Kolombangara monarch (nigrotectus) (as Monarcha nigrotectus)
White-collared monarch (as Monarcha vidua or Monarcha viduus)
White-eared monarch (as Monarcha leucotis)
White-naped monarch (as Monarcha pileatus)
White-naped monarch (buruensis) (as Monarcha buruensis)
Tanimbar monarch (as Monarcha castus)
Golden monarch (as Monarcha chrysomela)
Golden monarch (aruensis) (as Monarcha aruensis)
Golden monarch (melanonotus) (as Monarcha melanonotus)
Golden monarch (kordensis) (as Monarcha kordensis)
Ochre-collared monarch (as Monarcha insularis)
Shining flycatcher (as Monarcha alecto)
Velvet flycatcher (as Monarcha hebetior)

References

 
Monarchidae
Taxonomy articles created by Polbot
Bird genera